The 2010 Challenge Tour was the 22nd season of the Challenge Tour, the official development tour to the European Tour. The tour started as the Satellite Tour with its first Order of Merit rankings in 1989 and was officially renamed as the Challenge Tour at the start of the 1990 season.

Schedule
The following table lists official events during the 2010 season.

Challenge Tour Rankings
For full rankings, see 2010 Challenge Tour graduates.

The rankings were based on prize money won during the season, calculated in Euros. The top 20 players on the tour earned status to play on the 2011 European Tour.

See also
2010 European Tour

Notes

References

External links
Schedule on the European Tour's official site
Rankings on the European Tour's official site

Challenge Tour seasons
Challenge Tour